Ying Zhou may refer to:
Yingzhou (disambiguation) — a list of geographical locations
Zhou Ying (disambiguation) — a list of people surnamed Zhou
Ying Zhou (cricketer) - international cricketer from China